Black Sandy State Park is a public recreation area on the western shore of Hauser Lake reservoir, an impoundment of the Missouri River, located  northeast of Helena in Lewis and Clark County, Montana, in the United States. The park is along the Lewis and Clark National Historic Trail.

History
Prior to 1980, Montana Power Company owned the land and operated the park as a recreation area. In 1980, the company turned over management of the park to the Montana Department of Fish, Wildlife and Parks (FWP). In 1982, it was designated a state recreation area. Subsequently, the land was also turned over to FWP.

Activities and amenities
Recreational activities available at the park include hiking, tent and RV camping, swimming, picnicking, fishing, boating, and water skiing. Fish species include rainbow and brown trout, walleye, and perch.

In the news
In 2012, a prefabricated concrete office building was proposed to replace a wooden  building with a  concrete building with internet access at a cost of $40,000.

Adjoining property
Just south of the park, the White Sandy Recreation Area operated by the United States Bureau of Land Management has campsites and other amenities.

References

External links 

Black Sandy State Park Montana Fish, Wildlife & Parks
Black Sandy State Park Trail Map Montana Fish, Wildlife & Parks

State parks of Montana
Protected areas of Lewis and Clark County, Montana
Protected areas established in 1980